Fawfieldhead is a civil parish in the district of Staffordshire Moorlands, Staffordshire, England. It contains 17 listed buildings that are recorded in the National Heritage List for England.  Of these, one is at Grade II*, the middle of the three grades, and the others are at Grade II, the lowest grade.  The parish is almost completely rural, containing only small settlements.  Most of the listed buildings are farmhouses, farm buildings, houses and cottages; the other listed buildings include a bridge, two churches, one of which is combined with a school and a schoolmaster's house, two former chapels, and a war memorial..


Key

Buildings

References

Citations

Sources

Lists of listed buildings in Staffordshire